Salesh Kumar (born 28 July 1981) is a Fijian football midfielder who currently plays for Franklin United in the Northern League (New Zealand).

International career
Kumar made his debut for Fiji at the South Pacific Games 2003 and he has played for them in the 2010 FIFA World Cup qualification tournament.

References

External links
 
 2008/2009 season stats - NZFC

Living people
1981 births
Fijian footballers
Fiji international footballers
Fijian expatriate footballers
Ba F.C. players
Auckland City FC players
Nadi F.C. players
Navua F.C. players
Fijian people of Indian descent
Waitakere United players
Central United F.C. players
Lautoka F.C. players
Association football midfielders
Expatriate association footballers in New Zealand
Fijian expatriate sportspeople in New Zealand
New Zealand Football Championship players
2008 OFC Nations Cup players